Dirk Boonstra (2 September 1920 – 18 August 1944) was a member of the Dutch resistance in Groningen during World War II. He was captured and taken to Herzogenbusch concentration camp, where he and 12 other captives were executed on 18 August 1944.

External links 
 "Boonstra, Dirk" at nmkampvught.nl 

1920 births
1944 deaths
Deaths by firearm in the Netherlands
Dutch people executed by Nazi Germany
Dutch people of World War II
Dutch people who died in Nazi concentration camps
Dutch resistance members
Executed Dutch people
People executed by Nazi Germany by firing squad
People from Groningen (city)
People who died in Herzogenbusch concentration camp
Resistance members killed by Nazi Germany